Peristeronari is a village in Cyprus, near Lefka. De facto, it is under the control of Northern Cyprus.

References

Communities in Nicosia District
Populated places in Lefke District